Satan from the Seventh Grade is a 1960 Polish romance film directed by Maria Kaniewska. It is based on novel Satan from the Seventh Grade.

Cast
 Pola Raksa as Wanda
 Józef Skwark as Adam Cisowski
 Stanisław Milski as Professor Paweł Gąsowski
 Krystyna Karkowska as Gąsowska
 Kazimierz Wichniarz as Gąsowski
 Mieczysław Czechowicz as Painter
 Janusz Kłosiński as Żegota
 Aleksander Fogiel as Priest
 Krzysztof Krawczyk as Boy
 Leonard Pietraszak as Boy

References

External links
 

1960 films
1960s romance films
Polish romance films
1960s Polish-language films